David Prior may refer to:

 David Prior, Baron Prior of Brampton (born 1954), British Conservative Party politician
 David Prior (musician) (born 1972), British sound artist and composer
 David Prior (entrepreneur), Australian businessman and distillery owner
 David A. Prior (1955–2015), American screenwriter and director
 David Prior, American film director, screenwriter, and producer

See also
 David Pryor (born 1934), American politician
 David Priors, a fictional character from the BBC soap opera EastEnders